Andrew Gold is the first album by singer-songwriter Andrew Gold. It was released in 1975 on Asylum Records. Linda Ronstadt, of whose band Gold was a member at the time, appears on the album.

Reception
Rolling Stone's Stephen Holder said the album was "one of the year's most melodic" and "expresses, with warmth, humor and expertise, a special feeling for mid-Sixties rock." Holder notes that Gold "recaptures the essential spirit of 1964-65 Beatles music" and that his "ballads are as captivating as his rockers, if not more so."

AllMusic's James Chrispell retrospectively said the album contains "[a]n abundance of riches." Noting "[t]here are great Beatlesque melodies here, as well as heartfelt love songs that are Gold's specialties."

Uses in media
Leo Sayer covered Gold's song "Endless Flight" on his 1976 Endless Flight album.

Track listing 
All songs written by Andrew Gold, except where noted.

Personnel 
 Andrew Gold – vocals, electric piano (1), guitars (1-8, 10), bass (1, 3, 4, 8, 10), drums (1, 3, 4, 8, 10), percussion (1-8, 10), acoustic piano (2, 3, 4, 7, 8, 9), organ (3), marxophone (9)
 Dan Dugmore – pedal steel guitar (7)
 Kenny Edwards – backing vocals (1-6, 10), bass (2, 6, 7), lead guitar (5)
 Peter Bernstein – bass (5)
 Mike Botts – drums (2)
 Gene Garfin – backing vocals (1, 5, 10), drums (5)
 David Kemper – drums (6, 7)
 Bobby Keys – saxophones (4)
 Trevor Lawrence – saxophones (4)
 David Campbell – string arrangements and conductor 
 Don Francisco – backing vocals (1, 4)
 Linda Ronstadt – backing vocals (2, 3)

Production 
 Chuck Plotkin – producer
 Val Garay – engineer
 Michael Boshears – recording 
 Jeff Hawks – assistant engineer
 Doug Sax – mastering 
 The Mastering Lab (Hollywood, California) – mastering location 
 Glen Christensen – art direction 
 Tommy Steele – design 
 Bill Imhoff – illustration 
 Ken McGowan – photography
 Norman Epstein – management

References

1975 debut albums
Andrew Gold albums
Albums produced by Chuck Plotkin
Asylum Records albums